Matthew Russell may refer to:

 Matthew Russell (priest) (1834–1912), Irish Jesuit, founder and editor of the Irish Monthly magazine
 Matthew Russell (MP) (1765–1822), British MP for Saltash
 Matthew Russell, a member of American music trio Cheat Codes
 Matthew Russell (rower) (born 1972), Australian lightweight rower
 Matty Russell (born 1993), Scottish rugby league footballer of the 2010s
 Matt Russell (born 1973), American football executive and former linebacker for the Detroit Lions
 Matt Russell (footballer) (born 1978), English footballer

See also 
 Russell (surname)